Mohammad Ali Shah Qajar (21 June 1872 – 5 April 1925, San Remo, Italy), Shah of Iran from 8 January 1907 to 16 July 1909. He was the sixth shah of the Qajar Dynasty.

Biography

Mohammad Ali Shah Qajar was opposed to the Persian Constitution of 1906, which had been ratified during the reign of his father, Mozaffar ad-Din Shah Qajar. In 1907, Mohammad Ali dissolved the National Consultative Assembly and declared the Constitution abolished because it was contrary to Islamic law. He bombarded the Majles (Persian parliament) with the military and political support of Russia and Britain.

In July 1909, pro-Constitution forces marched from Persia's provinces to Tehran led by Sardar As'ad, Sepehdar A'zam, Sattar Khan, Bagher Khan and Yeprem Khan, deposed the Shah, and re-established the constitution.
On 16 July 1909, the parliament voted to place Mohammad Ali Shah's 11-year-old son, Ahmad Shah on the throne. Mohammad Ali Shah abdicated following the new Constitutional Revolution and he has since been remembered as a symbol of dictatorship.

Having fled to Odessa, Russia (currently Ukraine), Mohammad Ali plotted his return to power. In 1911 he landed at Astarabad, Persia, but his forces were defeated. Mohammad Ali Shah returned to Russia, then in 1920 to Constantinople (present day Istanbul) and later to San Remo, Italy, where he died on 5 April 1925 (bur. Shrine of Imam Husain, Karbala, Iraq). Every Shah of Persia since Mohammad Ali has died in exile.

His son and successor, Ahmad Shah Qajar was the last sovereign of the Qajar dynasty.

Honours
 Austria-Hungary: Grand Cross of the Order of Leopold (1900)
 French Third Republic: Grand Cross of the Legion of Honour (1907)
 Ottoman Empire: Exalted Order of the House of Osman (1905)
 Russian Empire:
Knight of the Order of St. Andrew (1905)
Knight of the Order of St. Alexander Nevsky (1905)
Knight of the Order of the White Eagle (1905)
Knight of the Order of Saint Stanislaus, 1st Class (1905)
Knight of the Order of St. Anna, 1st Class (1905)

Marriages and children

Wives
Mohammad Ali Shah had two wives:

 Robabeh Khanum "Malih-os-Saltaneh"
 Princess Zahra Qajar "Malekeh Jahan", daughter of Kamran Mirza "Nayeb-os-Saltaneh"

Children
Mohammad Ali Shah had six sons and two daughters:

Sons
 Hossein Ali Mirza "E'tezad Saltaneh"
 Gholam Hossein Mirza (died in infancy)
 Sultan Ahmad Mirza (later Ahmad Shah Qajar)
 Mohammad Hassan Mirza
 Sultan Mahmoud Mirza
 Sultan Majid Mirza

Daughters
 Khadijeh Khanum "Hazrat-e Ghodsieh"
 Assieh Khanum

List of prime ministers

 Mirza Nasrollah Khan Moshir od-Dowleh (till 17 March 1907) 
 Mirza Ali-Asghar Khan Amin os-Soltan (1 May 1907 – 31 August 1907)
 Mohammad-Vali Khan Tonekaboni (1st Term) (13 September 1907 – 21 December 1907) 
 Hossein Khan Nezam os-Saltaneh Mafi (21 December 1907 – 21 May 1908) 
 Morteza-Qoli Khan Hedayat Sani od-Dowleh (21 May 1908 – 7 June 1908) 
 Prince Kamran Mirza Nayeb os-Saltaneh (7 June 1908 – 29 April 1909)

See also
 Qajar Dynasty
 Qajar family tree
 Attempts at Constitutionalization in Iran
 Persian Constitutional Revolution
 Persian Cossack Brigade
 Anglo-Russian Entente
 1908 bombardment of the Majlis
 History of the Iranian Constitutional Revolution

References

Further reading

External links

 Portrait of Mohammad Ali Shah
 Portrait in Library of Congress collection
 Shah's palace in Odessa, Ukraine
 Photos of Qajar kings

1872 births
1925 deaths
20th-century monarchs of Persia
Mohammad Ali
Iranian royalty
People of the Persian Constitutional Revolution
Recipients of the Order of Saint Stanislaus (Russian)
Recipients of the Order of the White Eagle (Russia)
Monarchs who abdicated
Grand Croix of the Légion d'honneur
Iranian emigrants to Italy
Iranian exiles
Iranian emigrants to the Ottoman Empire